Wu Shuang Pu is a book of woodcut prints, first printed in 1694, early on in the Qing dynasty. This book contains the biographies and imagined portraits of 40 notable heroes and heroines from the Han Dynasty to the Song Dynasty, all accompanied by a brief introduction and guided by a related poem in yuefu style. The illustrations from the book were widely distributed and re-used, often as motifs on Chinese porcelain.

The original book has a seal what says Nanling, that's why the book is also known as Nanling Wu Shuang Pu. A re-edition of this book from the year 1699 is kept in the National Museum of China. In January 2006, an original hand-painted book of Wu Shuang Pu was sold at the Chongyuan auction house in Shanghai for 2.86 million CNY, some 440,000 Dollar (GBP 320,000).

The scholar and philologist Mao Qiling praised the book in the preface, he felt that the prose in this book formed a trinity with the poems and prints. 

The painter of Wu Shuang Pu is Jin Shi (金史, c.1625-1695), who was known as Jin Guliang (金古良), born in Shanyin (now Shaoxing, Zhejiang, China). Jin Guliang was inspired by Chen Hongshou and was following the examples of Cui Zizhong, who initiated the first major revival of figure painting since the Song Dynasty. Jin Guliang compiled the book together with woodcarver Zhu Gui.

Included biographies

Selected republications (Chinese)

References

External links

  
  The Gotheborg Antique Chinese and Japanese Porcelain Collector's Help and Info Page and Forum. Retrieved August 7, 2021
 

Chinese books
Chinese-language books
1694 books
17th-century prints